You've Never Seen Everything is the 21st studio album by Canadian singer-songwriter Bruce Cockburn, released on July 10, 2003.

Special guests on the album include Hugh Marsh, Jackson Browne, Emmylou Harris, Sarah Harmer, and Sam Phillips.

Reception

In a review for AllMusic, critic Thom Jurek wrote: "Of his many gifts, two of his most developed are his journalistic eye for detail, and having one ear always to the ground. This time out, the view is sharply contrasting from one song to the next. Politically, this is Cockburn's angriest record since World of Wonders or Stealing Fire... It is pointless to place this record in a pecking order with Cockburn's other work; that it adds to that body of work immeasurably is compliment enough. However, to say that it is necessary because it can cause self- and world-examination in any listener who plays it through is as high a compliment as can be offered." Geoff Ashmun of PopMatters called the album "spellbinding" and noted "Cockburn's as present and relevant as he's ever been better."

Track listing

Personnel 

 Bruce Cockburn - vocals, acoustic and electric guitars, dobro (track 8)
 Hugh Marsh - violins (except 5), loops (1, 3), keyboard, percussion (7)
 Andy Milne - piano (4, 5, 10)
 Grégoire Maret - harmonica (5)
 Colin Linden - electric mandolins (2), additional bass (7)
 John Dymond - bass (1–3, 6)
 Richard Brown - bass (4)
 Steve Lucas - bass (7, 11)
 Larry Taylor - upright bass (8, 9, 12)
 Gary Craig - drums and percussion (exc. 5, 7, 11)
 Ben Riley - drums (4, 7, 11), additional drums (1, 3)
 Stephen Hodges - drums and percussion (8, 9, 10), marimba (12)
 Dr. Divorce - loop (10)
 John Whynot - human whistle (10)
 Sam Phillips – vocal harmonies (1)
 Sarah Harmer – vocal harmonies (2, 11)
 Emmylou Harris – vocal harmonies (3, 7, 10)
 Maury LaFoy – vocal harmonies (6)
 Graham Powell – vocal harmonies (6)
 Jonell Mosser – vocal harmonies (8)
 Jackson Browne – vocal harmonies (9)

Production
 Bruce Cockburn – producer 
 Colin Linden – producer, additional recording 
 John Whynot audio engineer at
 Studio Frisson, Montreal
 The Clubhouse, Toronto
 Deep Field, Nashville
 Groove Masters, Los Angeles
 Devonshire, Los Angeles
 John Whynot – mixing at Skip Saylor Sound, Los Angeles
 Greg Calbi – mastering at Sterling Sound, New York

References

2003 albums
Bruce Cockburn albums